Arthromelodes is a genus of beetle belonging to the rove beetle family.

Species
The following species are accepted within Arthromelodes:

 Arthromelodes aizuanus Nomura, 1991
 Arthromelodes cariei Jeannel, 1954
 Arthromelodes choui Nomura, 1991
 Arthromelodes corniventris Nomura, 1991
 Arthromelodes crucifer Nomura, 1991
 Arthromelodes daibosatsuanus Nomura, 1991
 Arthromelodes daibosatsuanus daibosatsuanus
 Arthromelodes daibosatsuanus fujimontanus
 Arthromelodes daibosatsuanus shiranemontanus
 Arthromelodes dilatatus (Raffray, 1909)
 Arthromelodes giganteus Nomura, 1991
 Arthromelodes gyoja Nomura, 1991
 Arthromelodes hikosanus Nomura, 1991
 Arthromelodes kiiensis Nomura, 1991
 Arthromelodes loebli Nomura, 1991
 Arthromelodes mercurius Nomura, 1991
 Arthromelodes optatus (Sharp, 1874)
 Arthromelodes pilicollis Nomura, 1991
 Arthromelodes punctifrons Nomura, 1991
 Arthromelodes saikaiensis Nomura, 1991
 Arthromelodes sinuatipes Nomura, 1991
 Arthromelodes thysanoventris Nomura, 1991
 Arthromelodes watanabei S. Arai, 2002

References

Pselaphinae
Beetles described in 1954